Our Lady's Hospital is a general hospital in Navan, County Meath, Ireland. It is managed by Ireland East Hospital Group.

History
The hospital has its origins in the Navan Union Workhouse and Infirmary which was designed by George Wilkinson and opened in March 1842. The facility was reconstructed as Our Lady's Hospital in the 1920s. Following a march and protests in May 2014, the hospital still has a 24-hour accident & emergency service.

In June 2022, the Health Service Executive announced that it planned to close the accident and emergency department and to replace it with an urgent care clinic.

References

External links

Buildings and structures in Navan
Health Service Executive hospitals
Hospital buildings completed in 1842
1842 establishments in Ireland
Hospitals established in 1842
Hospitals in County Meath
19th-century architecture in the Republic of Ireland